The following is a list of Australian television ratings for the year 2019.

Network shares

Most Watched Broadcasts in 2019

Weekly ratings 
From the week beginning, 10 February 2019.

Weekly key demographics 
From the week beginning, 10 February 2015.

Key demographics shares

See also

Television ratings in Australia

References

2019
2019 in Australian television